Frederick "Ric" Richardson (born 1962 in Sydney, Australia) is an Australian inventor recognised for his early invention of a form of product activation used in anti-piracy. He is the inventor of record for a number of U.S. patents, including the Uniloc patent US5490216 and the Logarex patent 6400293. Richardson grew up in Sydney and currently resides in Byron Bay.

He founded Uniloc to commercialise his invention, and in 2003 it became a licensing company that has sought to license some of the patents that he is a named inventor of.  Some of these patents date back to 1992. The machine fingerprinting technology is used to stop copyright infringement; it was developed as Richardson worked on his own software called One-Step and later Truetime. He is now an independent inventor, and is seeking to develop technologies including ship designs, shark warning systems and password replacement technology.

Case of Microsoft vs. Uniloc
In Uniloc USA, Inc. v. Microsoft Corp., a jury awarded Uniloc US$388million against Microsoft for their infringement of a product activation patent licensed to Uniloc. The application before the court to go to trial was originally blocked by a summary judgement for Microsoft. A jury found that Microsoft products Windows XP, Office XP, and Windows Server 2003 infringed the Uniloc patent. They found damages and found that Microsoft's conduct was willful.  The presiding U.S. District Court Judge William Smith disagreed as a matter of law, overturning the jury's verdict and ruling in favour of Microsoft. This ruling was appealed, and reversed. Microsoft later settled, paying an undisclosed amount.

Profile as an Australian inventor

As a result of the publicity surrounding the case, Richardson has been the subject of two Australian Story episodes. The first called "The Big Deal" aired in August 2009 and covered the initial win of $388million by a jury in Rhode Island. The second entitled "A Done Deal" aired in April 2012 and covered the subsequent ups and down that followed the original story culminating in the eventual settlement with Microsoft.

In 2015, Richardson worked with other North Coast residents to investigate the use of a sonar-based alarm system for Byron Bay that alerts beach users of the proximity of large animals in the immediate vicinity. Richardson became involved with the project after a man will killed by a shark at Byron Bay the previous year.

Haventec 

In 2016, Richardson cofounded a security technology company called Haventec with Nuix chairman and interim CEO, Anthony "Tony" Castagna. The company is commercialising an invention by Richardson that uses public keys in combination with a one-time password technique to remove passwords from being stored or used on enterprise networks.

Another of Richardson's patented inventions is being used by the company to allow consumers to automatically enter credit card details using a technique that is more secure and reliable than browser technologies such as Chrome Auto-complete but does not require the credit card details to be stored on the merchant's servers.

Richardson's password-less authentication and one-click payment systems both rely on a concept of reducing the opportunity for hackers to infiltrate an enterprise system.

See also
Software patent

References

External links
 Ric Richardson blog
 Ric Richardson website
 Haventec
 Uniloc

21st-century Australian inventors
Living people
1962 births